GWT may refer to:
 Gawar-Bati language
 Given-When-Then
 Global workspace theory in cognitive science
 God's Word Translation, an English Bible translation
 Google Web Toolkit, or GWT Web Toolkit
 Great Western Trail, in North America
 Great Western Trains, now Great Western Railway
 Gross Weight Tonnage, a nautical measurement
 G-TELP Writing Test, English language test
 Guided wave testing
 The Gurkha Welfare Trust, a British charity
 Gwent Wildlife Trust, in Wales
 Sylt Airport, in Germany, by its IATA Code